

Incumbents
Monarch: Hans

Events

 August – Alvsson's rebellion starts.
 Knut Alvsson led Swedish forces in an attack on Båhus Fortress.
 The rebels led by Nils Ravaldsson succeed in occupying Marstrand and Sarpsborg.

Arts and literature

Births
 July 18 – Isabella of Burgundy, queen of Christian II of Denmark (d. 1526)

Deaths